Isobel Waddell is a Scottish curler from Hamilton, Scotland.

Teams

Women's

Mixed

Personal life
She is the grandmother of fellow curler Kyle Waddell.

References

External links
 

Living people
Scottish female curlers
Scottish curling champions
Sportspeople from Hamilton, South Lanarkshire
Year of birth missing (living people)